Stephen F. Windon (born 28 January 1959) is an Australian cinematographer. He is a frequent collaborator of film director Justin Lin.

Filmography

Films

Television

References

External links
 

1959 births
Living people
Australian cinematographers
Artists from Sydney